Cordelia Howard ( – ) was a child actor on the American stage.  Her most famous role was as Little Eva in the stage adaptation of Uncle Tom's Cabin.  One commentator wrote "The name of Little Cordelia has become synonymous with that of Little Eva." 

Her first stage role was in 1850, as a fairy sprite in the opera The Mountain Sylph. She originated the role of Little Eva in George L. Aiken's 1852 stage adaptation of Uncle Tom's Cabin, with her mother as Topsy and her father as Augustine St. Clare. The play was immensely popular, and Howard starred in Little Eva for hundreds of performances, continuing in the role until she was a teenager. She also starred as Little Dick and Pearl in stage adaptations of Oliver Twist and The Scarlet Letter, as well as the title character in the temperance play Little Katy; or, The Hot Corn Girl.

In 1871, she married Edmund Jesse Macdonald, a bookbinder, and retired from the stage.  Cordelia Howard died on 8 August 1941 in Bourne, Massachusetts.

References

External links
  "Memoirs of the Original Little Eva" by Cordelia Howard MacDonald

Created via preloaddraft
1848 births
1941 deaths
American stage actresses